The Star Garage (also known as the Crawford and Davis Livery Stable or Poole-Gable Motors) is a U.S. historic building in Gainesville, Florida. It is located at 119 Southeast 1st Avenue. On December 17, 1985, it was added to the U.S. National Register of Historic Places.

References

External links
 Alachua County listings at National Register of Historic Places
 Alachua County listings at Florida's Office of Cultural and Historical Programs

Buildings and structures in Gainesville, Florida
County government buildings in Florida
National Register of Historic Places in Gainesville, Florida